Dylan Chambost (born 19 August 1997) is a French professional footballer who plays as midfielder for  club Saint-Étienne.

Career
A youth product of Saint-Étienne, on 1 July 2019 Chambost signed with Troyes. He made his professional debut for Troyes in a 2–1 Ligue 2 loss to Clermont on 2 August 2019.

On 20 June 2022, Chambost returned to Saint-Étienne, signing a two-year contract with the club.

Honours 
Troyes

 Ligue 2: 2020–21

References

External links
 
 
 ASSE Stats Profile

1997 births
Living people
Sportspeople from Annecy
Footballers from Auvergne-Rhône-Alpes
French footballers
Association football midfielders
AS Saint-Étienne players
ES Troyes AC players
Championnat National 3 players
Championnat National 2 players
Ligue 2 players
Ligue 1 players